David Arthur Singh (May 28, 1929 – 1978) was a Guyanese diplomat and politician.

Career 
From 1945 to 1952 he was a primary school teacher.
From 1957 to 1959 he practised as a barrister.
In 1959 he was a Law Officer in the Attorney General's Chambers.
1967 returned to private practice.
In 1968 he was elected Member of Parliament.
From 1969 to  he was Minister of Housing and Reconstruction.
From  to 1976 he was the first ambassador in Beijing.

References

1929 births
1978 deaths
Ambassadors of Guyana to China
Government ministers of Guyana
Alumni of King's College London